Collateral Damage is a 2002 American action thriller film directed by Andrew Davis and starring Arnold Schwarzenegger, Elias Koteas, Francesca Neri, Cliff Curtis, John Leguizamo, and John Turturro. The film was released in the United States on February 8, 2002 to negative reviews and was a commercial failure.

The film tells the story of Los Angeles firefighter, Gordon Brewer (Arnold Schwarzenegger), who seeks to avenge his son's and wife's deaths at the hands of a guerrilla commando, by traveling to Colombia and facing his family's killers. The original script for the film had the same plotline but would have addressed American policy in the Middle East by taking place in Libya; director Davis and his screenwriters chose Colombia as the new location because it had not been used as extensively and touched on a current geopolitical conflict area.

Plot
A bomb detonates in the plaza of the Colombian Consulate building in Los Angeles, killing nine people, including a caravan of Colombian officials and American intelligence agents. Among the civilians killed are the wife and son of an LAFD firefighter, Captain Gordon "Gordy" Brewer, who was injured in the explosion. A tape is sent to the U.S. State Department, in which a masked man calling himself "El Lobo" (The Wolf) claims responsibility, justifying it as retaliation for the oppression of Colombia by the United States. The FBI believes El Lobo is a Colombian terrorist named Claudio Perrini. CIA Special Agent Peter Brandt, the Colombia Station Chief, is harshly reprimanded for the incident by a Senate Oversight Committee, which promptly terminates all CIA operations in Colombia. Brandt angrily returns to Mompós and meets with his paramilitary allies to plan a major offensive to take down Claudio.

Frustrated at the political red tape regarding the investigation, Brewer travels to Mompós to personally hunt down Claudio but is quickly arrested for illegal entry. The guerrillas stage a prison break to free their comrades and abduct Brewer to demand a large ransom for him. Brandt's unit is alerted to Brewer's presence in Colombia but arrive too late. Brewer escapes the prison, evades capture, and secures a guerrilla zone pass from Canadian mechanic Sean Armstrong. Armstrong introduces him to drug runner Felix Ramirez, the manager of the cocaine distribution facility that finances the guerrillas. Masquerading as a "mechanic", Brewer rigs several improvised explosives and destroys the facility. Felix is blamed for the destruction of the drug plant and is executed in front of a hiding Brewer's eyes. Brewer infiltrates Claudio's headquarters and plants a bomb to kill him, but he is captured when he tries to prevent a woman, Selena, from being caught in the blast radius along with her son, Mauro. At Claudio's home compound, Selena reveals she is Claudio's wife. She and Claudio once lost their own child during an American attack, which compelled Claudio to become a terrorist; Selena found and adopted Mauro, whose parents were killed in the attack. Regardless, Selena eventually sympathizes with Brewer and admits that Claudio is planning another bombing in Washington, D.C.

Meanwhile, Brandt's unit locates Claudio's compound and launches an attack. During the ensuing shootout, Selena helps free Brewer and, along with Brandt, travels back to the State Department in Washington, D.C. to help the search effort for Claudio. Selena identifies Union Station as the target, and the FBI investigates. On the pretense of using the lavatory, Selena excuses herself from the command room and becomes irritated when Mauro refuses to come with her. When Brewer sees Selena make the same gesture as the masked man who claimed to be El Lobo in the tape, he realizes that she was the Wolf all along, and Claudio serves as her figurehead, and that the entire motive behind their cause is personal revenge for the death of their daughter at the hands of the US. Furthermore, Brewer surmises the real target is the State Department, and that he was used to help Selena get past the building's security. Brewer quickly throws Mauro's bomb-laden toy dinosaur out a window seconds before it explodes. Brandt, realizing Brewer's suspicions, is shot and killed trying to stop Selena from fleeing the building.

Brewer chases Selena to the basement of the building where she and Claudio ride off through the tunnels on a motorcycle. Brewer finds the tunnel control console and shuts the gates, preventing their escape. Brewer uses an axe to rupture some gas lines along the walls of the tunnel and, as they ride back, Selena shoots at Brewer, unwittingly igniting the gas. Brewer jumps through a doorway just as the entire tunnel explodes. Selena and Claudio survive the blast, however, and attack him simultaneously. After a short, hand-to-hand fight, Selena is electrocuted by being tossed on the exposed circuitry of the control panel, and Claudio is himself killed when Brewer throws an axe into his chest before he can detonate a second bomb in the State Department.

In the aftermath, Brewer carries Mauro in his arms as they leave the State Department. A newscast voiceover explains that Brewer will receive the Presidential Medal of Freedom for preventing one of the worst terrorist attacks in U.S. history from taking place.

Cast

 Arnold Schwarzenegger as Captain Gordon "Gordy" Brewer, A Los Angeles firefighter who seeks Colombian terrorists responsible for the killing of his wife and son.
 Elias Koteas as Peter Brandt, the head of the CIA station of Colombia.
 Francesca Neri as Selena Perrini, the wife of Claudio. 
 Cliff Curtis as Claudio "El Lobo" Perrini, a Colombian terrorist known as the Wolf.
 John Leguizamo as Felix Ramirez, the manager of cocaine distribution facility.
 John Turturro as Sean Armstrong, a Canadian mechanic.
 Lindsay Frost as Anne Brewer, Gordy's wife.
 Ethan Dampf as Matt Brewer, Gordy's son.
 Miguel Sandoval as FBI Special Agent Joe Phipps, the FBI agent in charge.
 Harry Lennix as FBI Agent Dray, Phipps's FBI partner
 Jane Lynch as Agent Russo
 Tyler Posey as Mauro, the adopted son of Selena and Claudio.
 Fernando Sarfati as Federale
 Jsu Garcia as Roman, Claudio's right-hand man.
 Michael Milhoan as Jack, Gordy's fellow fireman.
 Rick Worthy as Ronnie, Gordy's fellow fireman.
 Raymond Cruz as Junior, Gordy's fellow fireman.
 J. Kenneth Campbell as Ed Coonts, the former military advisor of Colombia who gives Brewer advice to survive Colombia. 
 Rodrigo Obregón as Rodrigo
 Michael Cavanaugh as Chairman Paul Devereaux
 Nicholas Pryor as Senator Delich

Production

Filming
The film was shot in Los Angeles, New York and Washington, D.C. The scenes that represent Colombia were shot in the town of Coatepec in the state of Veracruz, Mexico. Filming in Mexico lasted ten weeks. First were shot during first eight weeks and then returned to roll other two.

Release

Marketing
The September 11, 2001 attacks affected the release and editing of the final film. The original trailer was scrapped because it showed a major bomb attack in the United States. The film was originally scheduled to be released on October 5, 2001, but it was postponed due to its terrorism theme and eventually released on February 8, 2002. The premiere was held four days earlier. Collateral Damage was also supposed to include Colombian actress Sofía Vergara in the role of an airplane hijacker; however the scene where Vergara would hijack a plane was cut from the film.

Home media
Warner Home Video released the DVD in the United States on July 30, 2002.

Reception

Box office
The film made $78.4 million worldwide against its $85 million budget.

Critical response
Rotten Tomatoes, a review aggregator, reports that 19% of 142 surveyed critics gave the film a positive review; the average rating is 4/10. The site's consensus reads: "Despite its timely subject matter, Collateral Damage is an unexceptional and formulaic action thriller." Metacritic rated it 33/100 based on 34 reviews. Audiences polled by CinemaScore gave the film an average grade of "B" on an A+ to F scale. Desson Howe of The Washington Post called the film "head-scratchingly ordinary" and wrote, "Even by the fast-and-loose standards of action filmmaking, Collateral Damage is a disappointment." Claudia Puig of USA Today said, "It's laughably unbelievable, yet it's hard to snicker at anything involving terrorists, even Collaterals obscure Colombian variety. What we get is simply another opportunity for Schwarzenegger — who seems to be in perpetual Terminator mode — to flex his muscles." Roger Ebert of the Chicago Sun-Times awarded the film three out of four stars and described it as "a skillfully made example of your typical Schwarzenegger action film".

See also
 List of American films of 2002
 Arnold Schwarzenegger filmography

References

External links
 
 
 
 
 
 

2002 films
2002 action thriller films
American action thriller films
2000s Spanish-language films
American films about revenge
Films about Colombian drug cartels
Films about terrorism in the United States
Films about firefighting
American vigilante films
Warner Bros. films
Films directed by Andrew Davis
Films postponed due to the September 11 attacks
Political controversies in film
Advertising and marketing controversies in film
Film controversies in the United States
Films set in jungles
Films set in Colombia
Films set in Los Angeles
Films set in Washington, D.C.
Films shot in Los Angeles
Films shot in Mexico
Films shot in Washington, D.C.
Films scored by Graeme Revell
2000s vigilante films
2000s English-language films
2000s American films